Mettmann I is an electoral constituency (German: Wahlkreis) represented in the Bundestag. It elects one member via first-past-the-post voting. Under the current constituency numbering system, it is designated as constituency 104. It is located in western North Rhine-Westphalia, comprising the southern part of the district of Mettmann.

Mettmann I was created for the inaugural 1949 federal election. Since 2021, it has been represented by Klaus Wiener of the Christian Democratic Union (CDU).

Geography
Mettmann I is located in western North Rhine-Westphalia. As of the 2021 federal election, it comprises the municipalities of Erkrath, Haan, Hilden, Langenfeld, Mettmann, and Monheim am Rhein from the district of Mettmann.

History
Mettmann I was created in 1949, then known as Düsseldorf-Mettmann. From 1965 through 1976, it was named Düsseldorf-Mettmann II. It acquired its current name in the 1980 election. In the 1949 election, it was North Rhine-Westphalia constituency 18 in the numbering system. From 1953 through 1961, it was number 77. From 1965 through 1980, it was number 73. From 1980 through 1998, it was number 72. From 2002 through 2009, it was number 105. Since 2013, it has been number 104.

Originally, the constituency was coterminous with the district of Düsseldorf-Mettmann. In the 1965 through 1976 elections, it comprised the southern parts of the district, specifically the municipalities of Erkrath, Haan, Mettmann, Hilden, and Wülfrath. It acquired its current borders in the 1980 election.

Members
The constituency was first represented by Gerhard Schröder of the Christian Democratic Union (CDU) from 1949 to 1969. He was succeeded by Georg Neemann in 1969, who served a single term before the Social Democratic Party (SPD)'s candidate Uwe Holtz was elected in 1972. He served until 1983, when Joseph-Theodor Blank of the CDU won it. Lilo Friedrich was elected in 1998 and 2002, before Michaela Noll of the CDU became representative in 2005. She was re-elected in 2009, 2013, and 2017. She was succeeded by Klaus Wiener in 2021.

Election results

2021 election

2017 election

2013 election

2009 election

References

Federal electoral districts in North Rhine-Westphalia
Mettmann (district)
Constituencies established in 1949
1949 establishments in West Germany